Spenceley or Spencely is an English surname that may refer to
Alfred Spenceley (1890–?), English boxer
George Spenceley, English photographer and mountaineer 
 Spenceley Glacier
Haydon Spenceley (born 1984), English Christian musician and worship leader 
Hugh Spencely (1900-1983), British architect
J. Spenceley, English cricketer
James Spenceley (born 1976), Australian businessman, entrepreneur and company director 

English-language surnames